

Number-one films 
This is a list of films which have placed number one at the box office in Australia during 2022.

Highest-grossing films

In-year releases

References

See also
 List of Australian films of 2022
 2022 in film
 List of 2023 box office number-one films in Australia

External links

2022
Australia